1980–81 was the sixty-eighth occasion on which the Lancashire Cup completion had been held.
 
Warrington won the trophy  by beating Wigan by the score of 26-10
The match was played at Knowsley Road, Eccleston, St Helens, Merseyside, (historically in the county of Lancashire). The attendance was 6,279 and receipts were £8,629.00

Background 

The total number of teams entering the competition remained at last season’s total of 14 with  no junior/amateur clubs taking part.
The fixture format was revised to remove the “blank” or “dummy” fixture. This resulted in two byes in the first round, and no byes in the second round.

Competition and results

Round 1 
Involved  6 matches (with two byes) and 14 clubs

Round 2 - Quarter-finals 
Involved 4 matches and 8 clubs

Round 3 – Semi-finals  
Involved 2 matches and 4 clubs

Final

Teams and scorers 

Scoring - Try = three points - Goal = two points - Drop goal = one point

The road to success

Notes and comments 
1  * This match played at nearby Warrington's Wilderspool because of the better facilities etc. (and in the hope of a bigger attendance )
2 * The attendance is given as 6,279 in Wigan's official archives, in RUGBYLEAGUEproject  files, and other articles - The attendance is given as 6,442 in Rothmans Rugby League Yearbook 1991-1992
3 * Knowsley Road was the home ground of St. Helens from 1890 to 2010. The final capacity was in the region of 18,000, although the actual record attendance was 35,695, set on 26 December 1949, for a league game between St Helens and Wigan

See also 
1980–81 Rugby Football League season
Rugby league county cups

References

External links
Saints Heritage Society
1896–97 Northern Rugby Football Union season at wigan.rlfans.com 
Hull&Proud Fixtures & Results 1896/1897
Widnes Vikings - One team, one passion Season In Review - 1896-97
The Northern Union at warringtonwolves.org

1980 in English rugby league
RFL Lancashire Cup